Baja Prog is an annual progressive rock festival in Mexicali, Baja California, Mexico, held since 1997.  It draws a number of well-known bands in the genre, and an average of 1500 attendees each day.

References

External links
 Official site
 Bands - 2007
 Schedule - 2007

Festivals in Mexicali
Music festivals established in 1997

Rock festivals in Mexico
Tourist attractions in Baja California